Richard Stauffacher (born 28 August 1982) is a Swiss windsurfer. He has competed at the Olympics since 2004 in the RS:X.

Results

References

External links 
 
 
 

1982 births
Living people
Swiss windsurfers
Swiss male sailors (sport)
Olympic sailors of Switzerland
Sailors at the 2004 Summer Olympics – Mistral One Design
Sailors at the 2008 Summer Olympics – RS:X
Sailors at the 2012 Summer Olympics – RS:X